Mount Cornwell may refer to:
 Mount Cornwell (Canada) on the British Columbia–Alberta border in Canada
 Mount Cornwell (Antarctica)